Henry Coalter Cabell House is a historic home located in Richmond, Virginia. Its name reflects prominent Richmond attorney and Confederate officer Henry Coalter Cabell, who rented the elegant house for many years.

Henry Coalter Cabell

The son of former Virginia governor William H. Cabell, who became a judge of the Virginia Court of Appeals was an important figure in Richmond society for decades. Around the time he began to rent this house, his law partner was Virginia attorney general Sidney Smith Baxter, the grandson of former Virginia governor William Fleming, who after being defeated for re-election in 1852, moved to Washington, D.C. to practice land law. From 1856 until his death he served on the board of the Virginia Historical Society. He also served on the boards of the Chesapeake and Ohio Railway Company, the James River and Kanawha Company and the Virginia Central Railroad.
Cabell accepted his first military commission as major of the 1st regiment Virginia Volunteers on December 1, 1857, and was promoted to captain of the 4th Regiment Virginia Artillery (a/k/a Fayette artillery) on December 21, 1859. A week after Virginia seceded, Cabell's artillery battery was activated and saw action at Gloucester Point in May. He received a promotion to lieutenant colonel of the 1st Regisment Virginia Artillery in September 1861 and by the following spring was promoted to artillery chief under John Bankhead Magruder and participated in the siege of Yorktown. Cabell received a promotion to full colonel on July 4, 1862, Cabell led an artillery battalion in Lafayette McLaw's division. That unit fought at the Battle of Antietem, the Battle of Fredericksburg at year end, the Battle of Chancellorsville, and supported Pickett's charge at the Battle of Gettysburg. Col. Cabell commanded a First Corps artillery battalion at the Battles of the Wilderness, Spotsylvania Court House, North Anna and Cold Harbor, and several times at the Siege of Petersburg acted as chief of artillery. Several Confederate generals recommended that Cabell be made a brigadier general on March 30, 1865, but no vacancy existed so he never received the promotion. He also did not surrender at Appomattox, because he and several other artillery officers engaged federal artillery on April 8, 1865 and had escaped toward Lynchburg. However, Cabell returned to Richmond, took the oath of allegeiance on July26, 1865 and received a presidential pardon from Andrew Jackson on August 1, 1865.
 

Following the conflict, Cabell was financially embarrassed . However, he resumed his law partnership with his brother in law William Daniel, formerly a judge of the Virginia Supreme Court. On January 11, 1884 his wife died after her clothing caught fire in this home, so Cabell moved to rooms at the Saint Claire Hotel in Richmond, where he died and was buried at historic Hollywood cemetery.

Architecture

It was built in 1847, and was originally built as a two-story, "L"-shaped Greek Revival style brick dwelling.  It was subsequently added to throughout the 19th century. It consists of a large central section with two-story portico, flanked by two smaller wings. The house features a portico supported by four columns with "Egyptian" lotus flower capitals.  It was the home of Henry Coalter Cabell, son of Governor William H. Cabell, and a Confederate veteran and leading member of the Richmond Bar.
It was listed on the National Register of Historic Places in 1972.

References

External links 
116 South Third Street (House), Richmond, Independent City, VA: 1 photo at Historic American Buildings Survey

Historic American Buildings Survey in Virginia
Houses on the National Register of Historic Places in Virginia
Greek Revival houses in Virginia
Houses completed in 1847
Houses in Richmond, Virginia
National Register of Historic Places in Richmond, Virginia
1847 establishments in Virginia
Cabell family